Charles Waldo Rezk (born 26 January 1969) is an American mathematician, specializing in algebraic topology, category theory, and spectral algebraic geometry.

Education and career
Rezk matriculated at the University of Pennsylvania in 1987 and graduated there in 1991 with B.A. and M.A. in mathematics. In 1996 he received his PhD from MIT with thesis Spaces of Algebra Structures and Cohomology of Operads and advisor Michael J. Hopkins. At Northwestern University Rezk was a faculty member from 1996 to 2001. At the University of Illinois he was an assistant professor from 2001 to 2006 and an associate professor from 2006 to 2014 and is a full professor since 2014.

He was at the Institute for Advanced Study in the fall of 1999, the spring of 2000, and the spring of 2001. He held visiting positions at MIT in 2006 and at Berkeley's MSRI in 2014. Since 2015 he has been a member of the editorial board of Compositio Mathematica.

Rezk was an invited speaker at the International Congress of Mathematicians in Seoul in 2014. He was elected a Fellow of the American Mathematical Society in the class of 2015 (announced in late 2014).

Selected publications

References

External links

1969 births
Living people
20th-century American mathematicians
21st-century American mathematicians
University of Pennsylvania alumni
Massachusetts Institute of Technology School of Science alumni
Northwestern University alumni
University of Illinois Urbana-Champaign faculty
Fellows of the American Mathematical Society
Topologists
Category theorists